The Lincs & Notts Air Ambulance is an air ambulance based at RAF Waddington which covers the administrative counties of Lincolnshire and Nottinghamshire and the unitary authorities of Nottingham, North East Lincolnshire and North Lincolnshire, England. The Lincolnshire and Nottinghamshire Air Ambulance Charitable Trust is a registered charity that derives a large percentage of its funding from donations.

History
A group of consultants at the Pilgrim Hospital proposed a helicopter service to ferry seriously ill patients to specialist units at other hospitals, avoiding the lengthy transfer times associated with Lincolnshire's road system. A charitable trust was formed on 9 February 1993.

The Lincolnshire Air Ambulance became operational at RAF Waddington in April 1994. Owing to the proximity of Waddington to Nottinghamshire, the service was extended to Nottinghamshire in 1997. 

In the year to March 2021, the charity raised income of £7.6million, including £95,000 of government grants. Expenditure was £8.2M, of which £6.7M was used to operate the charitable service.

Operational service
Its management has close co-operation (although not financial) with the East Midlands Ambulance Service (EMAS), who request assistance if a patient requires urgent medical treatment and transfer to a hospital Emergency Department.

Other air ambulances in the Midlands are straddled over several counties; Lincolnshire is the largest administrative county in central England, and the air ambulance is particularly beneficial given the width and undulating character of the Fen roads across the east of the county. More-seriously injured patients are normally ferried to the Queen's Medical Centre in Nottingham or Hull Royal Infirmary rather than Boston, Grantham, Lincoln or Scunthorpe.

In November 2013, the service completed its full night mission, responding to the scene and delivering the casualty to hospital in the hours of darkness with a single pilot. The Lincs and Notts service has trained all its Paramedic aircrew in the use of night vision goggles, which alleviates the need for two pilot operations, expanding the skill set of the aircrew. 

In the July 2015, the operational crew moved into a new purpose designed building at RAF Waddington, moving from the old V-bomber standby building the crew had used since 1994. The new building provides much more space and comes complete with a training and meeting room, ops room, crew room and several other needed improvements. 

The helicopter is fully night equipped including a search light. Normally flying within the hours of 7 am to 7 pm, in early 2018 the Trust announced an intention to provide 24-hour cover from an undisclosed point in the summer of 2018.

In April 2021 a new operational airbase with new helipad was opened off the A15 Sleaford Road, near to RAF Waddington. A purpose-built structure by Lindum Construction, it also houses the Critical Care Cars. 

In September 2020, the charity introduced a specialist Critical Care Car (CCC) in Nottingham. The CCC is crewed by HEMS doctors and paramedics and carries the same equipment found on the charity's helicopter - including a ventilators and advanced medicines. The new CCC is on-call to provide urgen care to emergencies in Nottingham and surrounding areas.

During the summer of 2021, the charity provided dedicated critical care response services to the Lincolnshire coast. From 1 June 2021, they initially provided a CCC, which carried all the equipment of an air ambulance to respond to incidents while they awaited delivery of a second helicopter. On 22 June 2021, the charity acquired the use a second helicopter to take over from their CCC, to provide a dedicated HEMS service to Lincolnshire's east coast during the peak of the tourist season. The second helicopter, and dedicated east coast critical care service, was withdrawn on 31 August 2021, following the conclusion of the peak of the tourist season.

Organisational structure
The charity's headquarters and helicopter are based in a new purpose-built facility on the A15, near Lincoln, opposite their previous RAF Waddington base. It also has a satellite office in Nottingham on the A612 near Nottingham Racecourse.

It has charity shops in Grantham, Grimsby, Spalding, Mansfield Woodhouse, Waddington and Mapperley.

Fleet
The original helicopter used was a MBB Bo 105, G-PASC, in service between 1994 and 2000.

G-LNAA, the helicopter operated by the service between 2000 and 2010, was returned to Specialist Aviation Services at Gloucestershire Airport, where it was overhauled before being used as the fleet-spare for their medical operations.

In November 2010, the service took delivery of a new MD902 Explorer, capable of flying for longer, faster and fully equipped for night operations. The leased aircraft was the first to be fitted with infection-resistant interior surfaces, and retained the yellow colour scheme worn by its predecessor, but had the registration of G-LNCT, after the Charitable Trust.

In October 2015, the charity announced that it had ordered an AgustaWestland AW169 aircraft to replace their current MD902. The new AW169, registered G-LNAC, was stated to have a larger cabin, better access to patients and increased speed. It was formally accepted by the charity in July 2016.

In 2021, the charity acquired two BMW X5 cars, which are used as rapid response critical car cars, carry the same equipment as their helicopter and can be used to provide specialist HEMS care to patients in locations where it is unsuitable to land their helicopter, or when the helicopter is not available. One of the two cars is dedicated to providing cover to Nottingham, while the other can be utilised in times of increased need (such as the busy tourist season in the summer months).

In June 2021, the charity acquired the use of an AgustaWestland AW109,  Helimed 82 (registered G-RSCU), as a second helicopter to provided dedicated cover to the Lincolnshire coast, allowing their primary helicopter to respond to other emergencies during the busy summer period. The second helicopter was based at the charity's HQ near Lincoln and flew out to Strubby airfield, Louth, Lincolnshire where it was stationed during the day to decrease response times to incidents on the east coast. On 31 August 2021, the charity withdrew their second helicopter from service and returned to owner Sloane Helicopters, a private HEMS services provider, from whom the helicopter had been on loan.

On 25 September 2021, the charity took delivery of a new AW169, which was due to replace their current aircraft. The new helicopter, registered as G-LNCC, was brought into service on 7 October 2021, flying its first mission just minutes after the completion of its final test flight.

See also
 East Midlands Ambulance Service
 Air ambulances in the United Kingdom

References

External links

 
 
 Association of Air Ambulances

North Kesteven District
Organisations based in Lincolnshire
Organisations based in Nottinghamshire
Organizations established in 1994
Health in Nottinghamshire
Air ambulance services in England
1994 establishments in England
Health in Lincolnshire